A gubernatorial election was held on 23 April 1959 to elect the Governor of Hokkaido Prefecture.

Candidates
Kingo Machimura - former Governor of Niigata and Toyama prefectures, age 58.
Setsuo Yokomichi - member of the House of Representatives, age 48.
 - artist and perennial candidate, age 52.

Results

References

Hokkaido gubernational elections
1959 elections in Japan